People's Hospital, Pragathi Nagar is a specialty hospital run under the management of People's Progress Trust and situated at Pragathi Nagar Panjayath. It started its operation in its current location in 2007. The hospital will be shifted to its new multi-complex building, which is under construction, in another couple of years. This hospital is known for its low cost healthcare services and access to lower and middle income group within the adjacent localities. The hospital has other facilities attached to it such as: pharmacy store, clinical laboratory etc.

Prgathi Vidya Nikethan is a CBSE public school under the same management which is located about 0.5 km from the hospital campus.

Departments
General Medicine
Obstetrics & Gynecology
PAEDIATRICS

External links
Pragathi Nagar Panjayat

Hospitals in Hyderabad, India
Hospital buildings completed in 2007